Dragon's teeth are square-pyramidal fortifications of reinforced concrete first used during the Second World War to impede the movement of tanks and mechanised infantry. The idea was to slow down and channel tanks into killing zones where they could easily be disposed of by anti-tank weapons.

They were employed extensively, particularly on the Siegfried Line.

World War II 
Dragon's teeth were used by several armies in the European Theatre. The Germans made extensive use of them on the Siegfried Line and the Atlantic Wall.

Land mines were often laid between teeth, and further obstacles were constructed along the lines of teeth, such as barbed wire to impede infantry or diagonally-placed steel beams to further hinder tanks. Many were laid in the United Kingdom in 1940–1941, as part of the effort to strengthen the country's defences against a possible German invasion.

Due to the huge numbers laid and their durable construction, many thousands of dragon's teeth can still be seen today, especially in the remains of the Siegfrieds.

Post World War II 
The term has survived into the present day and can be used to describe a line of posts or bollards set into the ground to deter vehicle access, for example in rural car parking areas or alongside roads.

Some stages of Rallye Deutschland, the German round of the WRC rally championship, are run on roads belonging to the military training ground at Baumholder. The roads are lined with dragon's teeth, known as "Hinkelsteine". They usually serve as obstacles to prevent tanks from leaving the roads, and cause significant damage to any rally car which veers off track.

By country 

 Switzerland continues to maintain lines of dragon's teeth in certain strategic areas. In military jargon, these constructions can be referred to as "Toblerone lines", after the chocolate bar.
 Korea - Dragon's teeth are present in some areas along the Korean Demilitarized Zone borderline.
 Germany - They were used on the East German side of the Berlin Wall.
 Yugoslavia - Some countries after the breakup of Yugoslavia have movable teeth, positioned at roadsides at strategic locations, which can be lifted and placed on the roads.
 Russia and Ukraine - In Belgorod Oblast, defensive lines of dragon's teeth were constructed in October 2022 under the supervision of the Wagner Group along the Russia-Ukraine border, intended as a second line of defense alongside trenches and a trained militia in the event Ukrainian armed forces break through the Russian border in the Russo-Ukrainian war. A series of dragon's teeth fortifications named the  have also been built by the Wagner Group in Russian-occupied Hirske in Luhansk Oblast. The Wagner Group aims to complete the Wagner Line in Russian-controlled Ukrainian territories as far east as Kreminna and as far south as Svitlodarsk.

See also 
 Caltrop
 Czech hedgehog
 Dragon's teeth (mythology)
 Jersey barrier
 Spike strip
 Toblerone line
 Wave-dissipating concrete block

References

External links 

 The Toblerone trail
 Dragon's Teeth in Horsham, West Sussex
 "You Build 'Em - We'll Bust 'Em." Popular Science, June 1942, pp. 106–112. Field expedient tank traps constructed of logs.
 White Cliffs Underground - Dragon's Teeth and Tank Traps around England's south coast
 Dragons Teeth on Libyan border with Egypt
 

Anti-tank obstacles